Owain ap Gruffydd  may refer to:

Owain Gwynedd (c. 1100–1170), Prince of Gwynedd
Owain Cyfeiliog (c. 1130–1197), Prince of part of Powys
Owain Goch ap Gruffydd (died c. 1282), ruler of part of Gwynedd in the late 1240s and early 1250s, brother of Llywelyn the Last of Gwynedd
Owen de la Pole, also known as Owain ap Gruffydd ap Gwenwynwyn (c. 1257–c. 1293), lord of Powys
Owain Glyndŵr (1354–1416), Prince of Wales